General elections were held in Luxembourg on 26 October 1919. They were the first held after several constitutional amendments were passed on 15 May of the same year. The reforms had introduced universal suffrage and proportional representation, increased the electorate from 6% of the population to 42%, and vested national sovereignty in the people, as opposed to the Grand Duke. They were also the first elections held after the German occupation during World War I.

The election saw the beginning of conservative dominance of Luxembourgian politics, ending seventy years of liberal dominance that had begun to crumble after the death of Paul Eyschen.  With the constitutional reforms and the birth of the modern political order, the elections are considered the first in the modern political history of Luxembourg.

Results
The election was an overwhelming victory for the Party of the Right, led by Émile Reuter, the sitting Prime Minister. The 1919 general election was the only occasion in Luxembourgian history on which a party has held more than 50% of the seats (although it was repeated in the partial election of 1922).  Reuter would maintain a coalition with the Liberal League (which ran under the name "Radical Party") for another two years, before forming the first single-party cabinet on 15 April 1921.

By constituency

References

Chamber of Deputies (Luxembourg) elections
Legislative election, 1919
Luxembourg
1919 in Luxembourg
October 1919 events
Election and referendum articles with incomplete results